Tătaru Mare Island (Romanian: Insula Tătaru Mare/Ostrovul Tătaru) is a Romanian island in the northernmost branch of the Danube Delta.

Characteristics
The island is home to the eponymous Ostrovu Tătaru village, within the Chilia Veche commune. Starting 2015, a Norwegian-funded minimum security prison functions on the island.

History
The island was part of Romania until the start of the Second World War. In the fall of 1940, the Romanian Danube islands of Tătaru Mare, Dalerul Mic, Dalerul Mare, Maican and Limba were occupied by the Soviet Union. All of the five islands were re-occupied by Axis-aligned Romania in July 1941 (Operation München), only to be lost again in 1944 after King Michael's Coup. In early 1948, the Soviet Union agreed to return Tătaru Mare Island back to Romanian rule, the only one of the five Danube islands ultimately recovered by Romania.

Maps

References 

River islands of Romania

Islands of the Danube
Romania–Soviet Union relations
Romania–Ukraine border
Military history of Romania during World War II